Loro Ciuffenna is a comune (municipality) in the Province of Arezzo in the Italian region Tuscany, located about  southeast of Florence and about  northwest of Arezzo.

Loro Ciuffenna borders the following municipalities: Castel Focognano, Castel San Niccolò, Castelfranco Piandiscò, Castiglion Fibocchi, Ortignano Raggiolo, Talla, Terranuova Bracciolini.

Sister cities
 Gruissan, France
 Tifariti, Sahrawi Arab Democratic Republic

References

External links

 Official website

Cities and towns in Tuscany